William Magee (18 March 176618 August 1831) was an Irish academic and Church of Ireland clergyman. He taught at Trinity College Dublin, serving as Erasmus Smith's Professor of Mathematics (1800–1811), was Bishop of Raphoe (1819–1822) and then Archbishop of Dublin until his death.

Biography 
He was born at Enniskillen, County Fermanagh, Ireland, the third son of farmer John Magee and Jane Glasgow.  He was educated at Trinity College Dublin (BA 1786, MA 1789, BD 1797, DD 1801), where he had been a Scholar (1784), and was elected fellow in 1788. He was appointed Erasmus Smith Professor of Mathematics (and Senior Fellow) in 1800, and in 1813 was elected a Fellow of the Royal Society as a "gentleman of high distinction for mathematical & philosophical knowledge & Author of several works of importance". Thought not a research mathematician, he was a popular teacher at TCD and was well-liked by students.

He had been ordained into the Church of Ireland in 1790, and two of his sermons (preached in the college chapel in 1798 and 1799) formed the basis of his "Discourses on the Scriptural Doctrines of Atonement and Sacrifice" (1801), a polemic against Unitarian theology, which was answered by Lant Carpenter. In 1812 he had resigned from TCD to undertake the charge of the livings of Cappagh, County Tyrone, and Killyleagh, County Down.

In 1813 he became Dean of Cork. He was well known as a preacher and promoter of the Irish Second Reformation, and in 1819 he was consecrated Bishop of Raphoe. In 1822 the Archbishop of Dublin was translated to Armagh, and Magee succeeded him at Dublin. Though in most respects a tolerant man, he steadily opposed the movement for Catholic Emancipation. He gained notoriety for prohibiting the Catholic inhabitants of Glendalough from celebrating Mass "as they had theretofore done in their ancient and venerated cathedral of St. Kevin".

He died on 18 August 1831 at Stillorgan, near Dublin. He had 16 children, of whom 3 sons and 9 daughters survived him. He was the grandfather of Archbishop William Connor Magee of York.

References

 Works of the Most Reverend William Magee, D.D., 1842.

External links
 Library Ireland: William Magee, Archbishop of Dublin
 The Works of the Most Reverend William Magee, Volume 1

1766 births
1831 deaths
People from Enniskillen
Academics of Trinity College Dublin
Alumni of Trinity College Dublin
Anglican archbishops of Dublin
Anglican bishops of Raphoe
Fellows of the Royal Society
Fellows of Trinity College Dublin
Irish mathematicians
Members of the Privy Council of Ireland
Scholars of Trinity College Dublin
Deans of Cork
Irish Anglican archbishops